Fewlass Llewellyn  (5 March 1886 – 16 June 1941) was a Welsh actor, playwright and theatrical producer. Previously an engineer, he made his stage debut in 1890, and appeared in various film roles, often as authority figures. A play he co-wrote with Ernest Martin formed the basis for the 1915 film  The Coal King.

Selected filmography
 Dombey and Son (1917)
 Goodbye (1918)
 The Lady Clare (1919)
 A Bill of Divorcement (1922)
 This Freedom (1923)
 The Flag Lieutenant (1926)
 The Further Adventures of the Flag Lieutenant (1927)
 Afterwards (1928)
 Virginia's Husband (1928)
 The Outsider (1931)
 These Charming People (1931)
 The Officers' Mess (1931)
 Lloyd of the C.I.D. (1932)
 Ask Beccles (1933)
 Seeing Is Believing (1934)
 The Secret of the Loch (1934)
 Red Ensign (1934)
 Royal Cavalcade (1935)
 Lazybones (1935)
 The Phantom Light (1935)
 Stormy Weather (1935)
 All In (1936)
 Second Bureau (1936)
 On Top of the World (1936)
 Tudor Rose (1936)
 Jack of All Trades (1936)
 Good Morning, Boys (1937)
 The Lilac Domino (1937)
 Brief Ecstasy (1937)
 It's a Grand Old World (1937)
 Special Edition (1938)
 A Spot of Bother (1938)
 Crackerjack (1938)

References

External links

1886 births
1941 deaths
Welsh male stage actors
Welsh male film actors
Welsh male silent film actors
Male actors from Kingston upon Hull
20th-century English male actors